Events from the year 1691 in art.

Events
 William Fermor, 1st Baron Leominster, buys the Metrological Relief (now on display at the Ashmolean Museum in Oxford).

Works

Paintings

 Matias de Arteaga – The Cluster of the Land of Promise
 Hyacinthe Rigaud – Portrait of Pierre Mignard

Sculpture
 Jean Del Cour – St James (Sint-Jacobskerk, Liege)

Births
 January 16 – Peter Scheemakers, Flemish Roman Catholic sculptor (died 1781)
 April 5 – Franz Joseph Spiegler, German fresco painter (died 1757)
 April 13 – Joseph-Charles Roettiers, French engraver and medallist (died 1779)
 June 2 – Nicolau Nasoni, artist and architect (died 1773)
 June 17 – Giovanni Paolo Pannini or Panini, Italian painter and architect, mainly known as one of the vedutisti or veduta or view painters (died 1765)
 date unknown
 Jan František Händl, Czech Roman Catholic priest and baroque painter (died 1751)
 Pietro Antonio Magatti, Italian painter known for paintings and frescoes in his hometown of Milan (died 1767)
 probable
 Antoine Aveline, French engraver (died 1743)
 Agostino Masucci, Italian painter of the late-Baroque or Rococo period (died 1758)

Deaths
 January 19 – Giacinto Brandi, Italian painter, active mainly in Rome and Naples (born 1621)
 April 3 – Jean Petitot, French-Swiss enamel painter (born 1607)
 May 13 – William Faithorne, English painter and engraver (born 1627/1628)
 September – Abraham Hondius, Dutch Baroque  painter known for animal paintings (born 1625)
 November 7 – Pieter Cornelisz van Slingelandt, Dutch portrait painter (born 1640)
 November 14 – Tosa Mitsuoki, Japanese painter (born 1617)
 November 15 – Aelbert Cuyp, Dutch landscape painter (born 1620)
 date unknown
 Giovanni Francesco Cassana, Italian portrait painter (born 1611)
 Giovanni Coli, Italian painter from Lucca (born 1636)
 Pietro Paolo Naldini, Italian sculptor (born 1619)
 Gury Nikitin, was a Russian painter and iconographer (born 1620)
 Cheng Sui, Chinese landscape painter during the Ming Dynasty (born 1605)
 Jacob van der Roer van Dordrecht, Dutch Golden Age portrait painter (born 1613)

 
Years of the 17th century in art
1690s in art